The year 1599 in science and technology involved some significant events.

Astronomy
 January 31 – During an observation of the lunar eclipse, Tycho Brahe discovers that his predictive theory about the movement of the Moon is wrong since the eclipse started 24 minutes before his calculations predicted: he improves on his theory.
 March 21 – Tycho sends a letter to Longomontanus, in which he reports his revised theory.
 June 14 – Tycho leaves Wittenberg and moves to Bohemia where he has been offered residence at the castle of Benátky, recently bought by Rudolf II, the Holy Roman Emperor.
 July 22 – Tycho observes a solar eclipse from Prague.

Biology
 Ulisse Aldrovandi begins publication of his Ornithologiae.
 Lawyer Carlo Ruini's Anatomia del cavallo is published posthumously in Venice. This anatomy of the horse is the first published of any non-human animal.

Chemistry
 Publication of the supposed German alchemist Basil Valentine's  ("Of the great stone of the ancients").

Geography
 George Abbot publishes the student geography textbook A Brief Description of the Whole World.
 Approximate date – A world map to accompany a new edition of Richard Hakluyt's The Principal Navigations, Voiages, and Discoveries of the English Nation and attributed to Edward Wright is the first using the Mercator projection to be engraved in England.

Navigation
 Edward Wright publishes Certaine Errors in Navigation, explaining the mathematical basis of the Mercator projection, and giving a reference table of adjustments required for its use in navigation.

Publications
 Ferrante Imperato publishes Dell'Historia Naturale illustrated from the mineral and other collections in his cabinet of curiosities in Naples.

Births
 November 15 – Werner Rolfinck, German scientist (died 1673)
 prob. date – Francis Glisson, English physician (died 1677)

Deaths
 August – Cornelis de Houtman, Dutch explorer (born 1565)
 November 7 – Gasparo Tagliacozzi, Bolognese surgeon (born 1545)

References

 
16th century in science
1590s in science